The Road to Divorce is a 1920 American silent drama film, directed by Phil Rosen. It stars Mary MacLaren, William Ellingford, and Alberta Lee, and was released on April 5, 1920.

Cast list
 Mary MacLaren as Mary Bird
 William Ellingford as Nathan Bird
 Alberta Lee as Mrs. Bird
 Edward Peil Sr. as Dr. Shaw
 Eugenie Forde as Aunt Mehitable
 Gloria Holt as Little Jane
 Arthur Redden as Little Johnny
 Bonnie Hill as Pauline Dallas
 Ray Stecker as Little son
 Helen Davidge as Nora

References

External links

Films directed by Phil Rosen
Universal Pictures films
American silent feature films
1920 drama films
1920 films
Silent American drama films
American black-and-white films
1920s American films